Joe Delaney, (born 4 August 1972 in Dublin, Ireland) is an Irish former professional snooker player.

Career
Born in 1972, Delaney turned professional in 1991. He endured several barren seasons on the tour before losing his place in 1997, but re-qualified during the 1997/1998 season, notably reaching the last 48 stage of the 1998 World Championship. There, he beat seven opponents, including Michael Holt, Munraj Pal, Jamie Burnett and Gary Ponting, before losing 7–10 to Dave Harold.

In his first season back on the tour, Delaney won the majority of his matches, but progressed only to the last 96 at a ranking event – the 1998 Grand Prix, where the declining Steve James beat him 5–2.

Having competed for another several seasons as an amateur, Delaney reached the final of a Challenge Tour event in 2003, defeating Paul McPhillips and Joe Jogia alongside five others, before losing 3–6 to Lee Spick. This performance was not enough for him to re-qualify, but the following season heralded runs to the last 16 at another Challenge Tour event – losing 1–5 to Cypriot Mehmet Husnu – and the fifth qualifying round at the 2003 World Championship, where Gary Hardiman beat him 5–3. These results did earn Delaney a place on the main tour for the 2003/2004 season.

The following three seasons were without any significant progress, but Delaney enjoyed better form in 2006/2007. He reached the last 48 at the 2006 UK Championship, defeating Andrew Higginson 9–5 and fellow Irishman Fergal O'Brien 9–7 before losing to Northern Ireland's Joe Swail, also 9–7. The 2007 Welsh Open, in which Higginson would reach the final as an amateur, heralded a 5–3 victory over Spick and a 5–4 defeat of Marcus Campbell, but Delaney lost in the last 48, 0–5 to Stuart Bingham.

Earlier in the season, he had played in the 2006 Irish Professional Championship, beating fifty-seven-year-old Alex Higgins 5–2 before losing in the quarter-finals to a resurgent Ken Doherty; the former would be Higgins's penultimate competitive match.

At the 2007 World Championship, Delaney defeated Ian Preece 10–7, having trailed 1–5, Barry Pinches 10–9 from 6–9 behind, and Alan McManus by the same scoreline to reach the main stages at the Crucible Theatre for the first time in his career. In his last-32 match against Matthew Stevens, Delaney came to trail 0–5, and eventually lost 2–10.

At the 2007 Grand Prix, Delaney progressed from his qualifying group – recording victories over Issara Kachaiwong, David Gilbert, David Gray, 4–0 over Pinches and a 4–3 defeat of Spick – but lost all five of his group matches.

The 2008/2009 season saw Delaney reach the last 64 in four tournaments – beating Spick 5–0 in the Northern Ireland Trophy after Spick had conceded having fallen ill, and again in the Welsh Open, 5–3, before a 1–5 defeat to Gerard Greene in the latter. At that season's World Championship, he lost 1–10 to Judd Trump.

By the end of the 2009/2010 season, Delaney's form had slipped, although he recorded a 10–0 whitewash over Sam Baird in qualifying for the 2010 World Championship; in his next match, he recovered from 0–8 down against Adrian Gunnell to trail only 7–9, leading the seventeenth frame by fifty-six points before Gunnell made a break of 64 to prevail 10–7.

With the introduction of Players Tour Championship events in 2010, Delaney played in fourteen tournaments that season, notably beating Patrick Einsle, Rory McLeod, Greene and Li Yan before exiting at the last-32 stage at the 2010 Shanghai Masters, 3–5 to Mark King.

2010/2011 brought no more success, however, and Delaney finished his season with a 4–10 World Championship qualifying defeat to Jogia. Ranked 81st at its conclusion, he dropped off the tour once more, aged 38.

As an amateur, he came within one win of returning to the tour in 2012 in one of the Q-School events, but lost his quarter-final match 0–4 to Rod Lawler.

Personal life
Alongside his father and brother, Delaney runs a furniture business which makes seating for restaurants, nightclubs and cinemas.

Performance and rankings timeline

Career finals

Non-ranking finals: 1

References

External links
Joe Delaney profile at World Snooker

1972 births
Living people
Irish snooker players
Sportspeople from Dublin (city)